Slatyford is situated in the West End of Newcastle upon Tyne, England, and houses the Stagecoach North East depot for local bus services throughout Newcastle. The depot was previously used by Newcastle Busways. Alongside the depot, following demolition of an existing site, a retail complex has been built, centred on a Wickes store.

Slatyford is also known by the slang name of 'Slaty'.
the park is called slatypark
The Tyneside Badminton Centre, which opened in 2013 is located in the area.  It currently has three high-quality courts with plans to expand with the addition of a further six badminton-specific courts.

References 

Districts of Newcastle upon Tyne